Debbie Leonidas (née Chapman) is a former association football player who represented New Zealand at international level.

Leonidas made her Football Ferns debut in their first ever international as they beat Hong Kong 2–0 on 25 August 1975 at the inaugural AFC Women's Asian Cup, her sister Marilyn Marshall making her New Zealand debut in the same match. Leonidas finished her international career with 19 caps and 1 goal to her credit.

Honours

New Zealand
AFC Women's Championship: 1975

References

Year of birth missing (living people)
Living people
New Zealand women's association footballers
New Zealand women's international footballers
Women's association footballers not categorized by position